Victim Prime is a novel by Robert Sheckley published in 1987.

Plot summary
Victim Prime is a novel in which the deadly Hunt is played in a resort in a dystopian 2092.

Reception
Dave Langford reviewed Victim Prime for White Dwarf #87, and stated that "It moves well enough, but despite ingenious ploys and counterploys has a touch of staleness: Sheckley imitating Sheckley."

Reviews
Review by Brian Stableford (1987) in Fantasy Review, April 1987
Review by Tom Easton (1987) in Analog Science Fiction/Science Fact, November 1987
Review by Edward Bryant (1987) in Rod Serling's The Twilight Zone Magazine, December 1987
Review by Lee Montgomerie (1987) in Interzone, #21 Autumn 1987
Review by Mike Christie (1987) in Foundation, #39 Spring 1987

References

1987 novels